American Boyfriend: A Suburban Love Story is the second studio album by American recording artist Kevin Abstract, released on November 18, 2016.

Background 
On January 15, 2015, Kevin Abstract informed fans via his Twitter page that his record was to be titled Death of a Supermodel and that it would be released later in the year. This album was then later discarded, however. Abstract then announced that he was working on a different album, They Shoot Horses, a part of the Death of a Supermodel trilogy. In November, the first single from They Shoot Horses, "Echo" was released, along with a music video directed by Tyler Mitchell.

At the end of June 2016, Kevin announced that he had changed the title of his upcoming album to American Boyfriend: A Suburban Love Story and that it would still be coming later in the year.

The album's second single "Empty" was released on September 20, 2016, alongside a self-directed music video.

The album's release date was confirmed as November 18 on October 24. The album's artwork, designed by Tyler Mitchell and Henock "HK" Sileshi, and track listing were released on October 31.

The album's third single, "Yellow" was premiered by Zane Lowe on Beats One on November 2, followed by "Miserable America", premiered by Shane Powers on Dash Radio the next day.

Reception 
American Boyfriend: A Suburban Love Story received generally positive reviews upon release. Ryan Bassil of Noisey said, "it's one of the most nuanced and touching documentations of the gloriously testing period that forms the experience of growing up and becoming yourself." David Turner of Pitchfork said, "American Boyfriend can feel a bit scattered and unsure, but it’s an album seeking love in a world now primed to find new angles for hate. For that reason alone, it feels welcome."

Track listing 

Notes
  signifies a co-producer
  signifies an additional producer
 On the physical version of the album, "Kin" is 3:26 long.
 "Seventeen" features additional vocals by Ivana Nwokike and Sunday Osunwa.
 "Tattoo" features additional vocals by Sunday Osunwa.
 "Yellow" features additional vocals by Ivana Nwokike, Sunday Osunwa, Teo Halm and Roy Blair.
 "Runner" features vocals by Roy Blair.
 "Papercut" features additional vocals by Ivana Nwokike and Roy Blair.
 "June 29th" features vocals by Sunday Osunwa.
 "Miserable America" features additional vocals by Russell "Joba" Boring.
 "Echo" features additional vocals by Roy Blair.

Personnel 

 Kevin Abstract – lead artist, creative direction, writer (tracks 1-11, 13-16), production (tracks 3, 4, 7, 8, 10, 16), co-production (track 2), additional production (track 9), engineering (track 9)
 Bearface – writer (track 14), production (track 14), engineering (track 14)
 Ramsay Bell – photographer
 Bradley Bledsoe – publicity
 Russell "Joba" Boring – writer (tracks 1, 5, 6), production (track 7), trumpet (track 11), additional programming (track 13), additional vocals (track 13), engineering (tracks 1, 5, 7, 11, 13), mix (tracks 3, 4, 7, 16)
 Austin Brown – photographer
 Captain Noah – additional guitars (track 5, 6)
 Chris Clancy – management
 Kelly Clancy – management
 Jordan Cole – children's choir (track 1)
 Izzy Commers – photographer
 Daedelus – additional synths (track 6)
 Nick Dierl – publicity
 Jeff Gitty – writer (track 16), additional guitars (track 6), vocoder (track 16)
 Albert Gordon – production (track 15)
 Ashlan Grey – photographer
 Robert Hale – production (track 7)
 Teo Halm – assistant production (tracks 5, 6), additional vocals (track 6)
 Romil Hemnani – production (tracks 2, 4, 10, 11, 15, 16), co-production (track 5), additional production (tracks 1, 9), additional drum programming (tracks 9, 13), engineering (tracks 2, 4, 5, 9-11, 13, 15, 16)
 Carmen Jackson – choir (tracks 5, 13)
 Jordan Jackson – choir (tracks 5, 13)
 Jordan Jones – engineering (track 6)
 Om'Mas Keith – production (tracks 5, 6), vocal production (track 6), choir arrangement (track 5), engineering (track 6)
 Brandon Thoreau Kelly – engineering (track 6)
 Jeff Kleinman – mastering, production (1, 5, 6, 8, 9, 12, 13), co-production (track 2), additional production (tracks 3, 11, 15, 16), additional guitars (track 14), engineering (tracks 1, 2, 5, 8, 9, 11, 13, 14, 16), mix (tracks 1, 2, 5, 6, 8-12)
 Jack Loken – guitar (track 10), additional guitar (track 9)
 Roy Mabie – writer (tracks 1, 9), production (tracks 3, 10), additional production (track 9), drum programming (track 6), vocals (track 9), additional vocals (tracks 6, 11, 15), engineering (3, 6, 10, 15)
 Craig Marshall – legal counsel
 Tyler Mitchell – photographer
 Jon Nunes – management
 Ivana Nwokike – additional vocals (tracks 2, 6, 11)
 Anish Ochani – management
 Robert Ontenient – web development
 Sunday Osunwa – vocals (track 12) additional vocals (tracks 2, 5, 6) 
 Ricky Reed – production (tracks 13, 14), additional guitars (track 14), engineering (tracks 13, 14), mix (tracks 13, 14)
 Michael Rosen – harmonica (track 5)
 Henock Sileshi – creative direction, album art design and packaging
 Jaslyn Taylee – children's choir (track 1)
 Michael Uzowuru – executive producer, writer (tracks 1, 2, 5, 6, 12-14), production (tracks 1, 5, 6, 9, 11, 13), co-production (track 2), additional production (tracks 3, 15, 16), choir arrangement (tracks 5, 13)
 Brian Washington – management
 William Wood – writer (tracks 5, 15)
 VanJess – choir (tracks 5, 13), choir arrangement (track 13)

References

2016 albums
Kevin Abstract albums
Albums produced by Michael Uzowuru